Ziggo Holding B.V. is the largest cable operator in the Netherlands, providing digital cable television, Internet, and telephone service to both residential and commercial customers.

History
The company is the result of the merger between Multikabel, @Home, and Casema and launched officially on 16 May 2008. Later followed by a merger with UPC Nederland in the first quarter of 2015, at that time the second largest cable company in the Netherlands. It kept the brand name Ziggo. Its main competitors are KPN and CanalDigitaal.

Most of the share capital was up to 2012 held by holding companies of two private equity firms: Cinven and Warburg Pincus.

On 21 March 2012, Ziggo was listed on the NYSE Euronext stock exchange and later incorporated into the midcap equity AMX index. Additionally, there are options traded on the Ziggo share.

Cinven and Warburg Pincus started to reduce their stake in Ziggo and exited Ziggo in April 2013.

In March 2013, Liberty Global acquired a 12.65% stake in Ziggo. This grew to 15% in April and 28.5% in July.

On 27 January 2014, Liberty Global announced that it would be acquiring all remaining shares in Ziggo for €10 billion. The takeover was subject to regulatory approval and was expected to close by the second quarter of 2014, when Ziggo was expected to merge with UPC Nederland. In May 2014, the European Commission announced opening an in-depth investigation to assess whether the proposed acquisition of Ziggo by Liberty Global is in line with the EU Merger Regulation. The opening of an in-depth inquiry does not prejudge the outcome of the investigation. In November 2014, Liberty Global took over Ziggo. In December 2014, the shares of Ziggo N.V. were delisted from Euronext Amsterdam as Ziggo was converted into the Dutch private limited company (besloten vennootschap) Ziggo Holding B.V.

On 5 January 2015, Ziggo started to harmonize its cable network with the UPC Nederland cable network. The name UPC was finally phased out in favor of Ziggo on 13 April 2015.

On 15 February 2016, British telecommunications company Vodafone announced the merger of their Dutch operations Vodafone Netherlands with Liberty Global, the owner of Ziggo. The deal was closed on 31 December, creating a new parent company for both Ziggo and Vodafone, called VodafoneZiggo, with a 50/50 joint ownership by Liberty Global and Vodafone.

Cable television
In 2014 the Ziggo hybrid fiber-coaxial cable network (a broadband network that combines optical fiber and coaxial cable) passed 7.140 million homes in the Netherlands.

Technology

Television signal
The digital television signal is transmitted in the Digital Video Broadcasting-Cable (DVB-C) standard. The high-definition channels are encoded in H.264/MPEG-4 AVC and most standard-definition channels are encoded in MPEG-4. Only a part of the free-to-cable standard-definition channels are still encoded in MPEG-2. Customers can buy or rent a certified set-top box or Integrated Digital Television with embedded CA. Additionally customers can buy any television or set-top box with a DVB-C tuner for the free-to-cable basic subscription and optionally included by CI+ support with a Ziggo compatible conditional-access module for supplemental packages. As of 2015, Ziggo uses both the Nagravision and Irdeto conditional access system.

In 2022 Internet Protocol television (IPTV) was introduced for delivery of television content over Internet Protocol (IP) networks. For this the Next Mini decoder was introduced as standard television receiver for customers that also have an internet subscription. This IPTV-only television decoder is similar to the Liberty Global Mini TV Box and makes all television content visible via IPTV. The Next Mini is connected with the Ziggo network via Ethernet wiring or wireless via Wi-Fi. The number of television channels and other IP-stream content that can be viewed with IPTV hardware over a coax cable or fibre-optic cable based high-speed internet connection within a household is virtually unlimited. Practically, the provider determines which television channels and other content IP-streams are forwarded or not. Speculation is circulating on the internet that Ziggo introduced IPTV to make it easier for customers of competing combined high-speed internet and IPTV services providers, to switch to Ziggo or that DVB-C will be switched off in the future.

Previously, Ziggo also offered an analogue television signal. Between 2018 and 2021, it gradually phased out the analogue signal.

Radio signal
The digital radio signal is transmitted in the DVB-C standard. For digital radio a 2-channel (stereo) MPEG-1 Audio Layer II encoded digital audio broadcasting signal at 48 kHz audio sampling rate is used. According to measurements the bit rates of the offered digital radio channels vary, and some radio channels have a variable bit rate (VBR). A company spokesperson stated Ziggo passes the digital radio stations to its end users as provided by the radio channels and does not re-encode, change or edit these digital signals to avoid quality reduction.

Previously, Ziggo also offered an analogue radio signal. Between February 2021 and March 2022 the analogue FM cable radio signal was gradually phased out.
According to TVTotaal the analogue FM cable radio service was terminated because due to competitive pressure Ziggo needed the bandwidth to increase the upload speed of the internet service. According to VodafoneZiggo; "The freed-up bandwidth allows us to offer even more television and internet services, such as increasing image quality and adding apps." and "We continue to innovate and look ahead, so that our GigaNet (internet service) grows with the needs of our customers. The complete switch to digital radio is a crucial part of that."
For customers who are not able to receive the digital radio signal, Ziggo up to 29 May 2022 offered a digital radio receiver for €50 as an alternative for analogue FM cable radio reception equipment.

Channels
Ziggo provides about 200 linear television channels and more than 100 linear radio channels, DVR service, video-on-demand content, catch-up TV from public television broadcasters and commercial television stations and interactive television. About 40 TV channels and 40 radio channels are transmitted in clear, while most premium channels are transmitted encrypted.

Basic service is called Kabel TV and consists of about 40 digital television channels, as well as 40 digital and analogue radio channels. It consists of all the major Dutch networks and some of the main networks of neighbouring countries. Additional TV and radio channels are available through "TV Standard", "Movies & Series XL" and premium packages. Every additional package comes with Xite Music which offers 40 additional radio channels, as well as interactive video on demand services.

As of 2022 Ziggo offers most television channels in 1080i or 720p HD format. Also including premium film and sport services such as Film1 HD, ESPN HD and Ziggo Sport Totaal HD. The rest are part of basic service. A few channels/programmes are (sometimes temporarily) offered in 1080p Full HD, 4K Ultra HD and if available in HDR color representation.

On 4 July 2009 the Dutch public broadcaster NPO started simulcasting NPO 1, NPO 2, and NPO 3 in 1080i high-definition. These public HD channels are part of basic service.

Ziggo GO
Ziggo GO is an online television service from Ziggo. The service allows users to watch live TV and on demand video content from a PC, laptop, tablet and mobile phone. It is also possible to stream live TV on Chromecast and Apple TV. The service was introduced by UPC in 2012. It was named Horizon TV app or Horizon GO. The service was renamed by Ziggo GO on 9 November 2016.

From 2017 until 2021 - after the closing of HBO Netherlands and before the Netherlands launch of HBO Max, all HBO content was available on Ziggo GO.

Internet

In the Netherlands, there are three types of connections for landline broadband access internet available: (A)DSL, cable and fiber-optics. Almost every of the about 8.1 million Dutch households in 2022 had (A)DSL and cable internet access. Due to the almost universal cable availability and progressing roll-out of several fiber-to-the-home (FFTH)  XGS-PON networks, it is expected (A)DSL will be phased out in the future and four gigabit landline networks are too many to be commercially economically viable. Mergers, acquisitions or mutual cooperation between these high-speed internet networks are expected at some point. At the end of 2022 5.34 million Dutch homes were passed by at least one FFTH network. Up to 2023 the growth of FFTH was mainly due to the declining use of (A)DSL in providing internet.
The combined cable and FFTH networks offered access to 1 Gbit/s download speeds for 97% of the Dutch residential addresses at the end of 2022.

Technology

Hybrid fiber-coaxial DOCSIS data transfer
Ziggo offers cable broadband internet subscriptions, and their hybrid fiber-coaxial (fiber-to-the-neighborhood [FFTN]) network passed 7.3733 million of the about 8.1 million Dutch homes in 2022. For internet, Ziggo used and uses various versions of Data Over Cable Service Interface Specification (DOCSIS) technology. DOCSIS is used by many cable television operators to provide cable internet access over hybrid fiber-coaxial infrastructure. As Ziggo is a European operator, the used DOCSIS standards earlier than DOCSIS 3.1 were modified for use in Europe (EuroDOCSIS). , Ziggo had 3.240 million Internet access subscribers and 3,328 million subscribers in December 2022, which means that 45.1% of the homes passed paid Ziggo for internet access.

On 10 October 2019 Ziggo started the deployment of DOCSIS 3.1 in limited regions. This upgrade to DOCSIS 3.1 enabled download speeds up to 1 Gbit/s and is marketed as GigaNet. Since then EuroDOCSIS 3.1 was rolled out widely to offer asymmetric Internet access with asymmetric upload speeds of up to 50 Mbit/s. Ziggo completed the DOCSIS 3.1 roll-out operation in December 2022. At the same time, the company announced it is preparing for DOCSIS 4.0 (previously branded as DOCSIS 3.1 Full Duplex) tests in early 2023. Besides increased download speeds, DOCSIS 3.1 and especially DOCSIS 4.0 also technically enable significant increases in upload speeds. In 2022 Ziggo introduced the Sagemcom F3896LG-ZG/F@st 3896 DOCSIS 3.1 Full Duplex capable modem featuring an 2.5 Gbit/s Ethernet port that can deliver up to 5 Gbit/s download and 2 Gbit/s upload speeds.

Small-scale introduction of fiber-to-the-home (FFTH) connections
On a small project scale, Ziggo offers fiber-to-the-home (FFTH) connections since 2021. In the projects where Ziggo opts to extend the fiber-to-the-neighborhood (FFTN) into the customer's (new-build) home, significant additional construction costs like earthwork are avoided and a fiber to coax converter is still present. This ensures customers can continue to use their existing equipment. The FFTH offered services by Ziggo are identical to their non-FFTH offerings.

Telephony
, Ziggo has 2.551 million subscribers to their land-line telephone services and 2.065 million subscribers in December 2022. It also offered a virtual mobile phone service. Ziggo Mobile stopped offering new mobile subscriptions in April 2017, and existing mobile customers were migrated to Vodafone Netherlands in September 2017.

Triple play
, 64.7% of subscribers have a triple play subscription: a cable television, internet and telephone service bundle.

Customers and business performance
At the end of 2020, the company provided at least one service to more than 3,836,300 households: 3,831,300 households with television, 3,363,500 households with an internet connection and 2,272,800 households with telephony. It then had 5,189,800 mobile subscribers (4,757,100 postpaid and 432,700 prepaid).. In 2022 there were about 8,100,000 households in the Netherlands.

See also
 Digital television in the Netherlands
 Internet in the Netherlands
 List of cable companies in the Netherlands
 Television in the Netherlands
VodafoneZiggo
 Vodafone Netherlands
 XMO
 Ziggo Dome
 Ziggo Sport

References

External links
 

Telecommunications companies of the Netherlands
Cable television companies of the Netherlands
Internet service providers of the Netherlands
Private equity portfolio companies
Mass media in Utrecht (city)
Liberty Global
Vodafone